Julian Michael Cradick (born 27 November 1947) is a former English cricketer.  Cradick was a right-handed batsman.  He was born at St Dominick, Cornwall.

Cradick made his Minor Counties Championship debut for Cornwall in 1984 against Devon.  From 1984 to 1986, he represented the county in 15 Minor Counties Championship matches, the last of which came against Berkshire.  Cradick represented Cornwall in a single MCCA Knockout Trophy match against Dorset in 1985.

Cradick also represented Cornwall in a single List A match against Derbyshire in the 1986 NatWest Trophy.  In his only List A match he scored 10 runs.

References

External links
Julian Cradick at Cricinfo
Julian Cradick at CricketArchive

1947 births
Living people
People from Callington, Cornwall
English cricketers
Cornwall cricketers